Luke Muyawa (born 20 December 1989) is a retired Malawian football midfielder.

References

1989 births
Living people
Malawian footballers
Malawi international footballers
Eagle Strikers FC players
Moyale Barracks FC players
Association football midfielders